Backhander or Backander may refer to:

 Helge Bäckander, a Swedish gymnast
 A backhand shot in several sports, or a person who makes such shots
 See Backhand (disambiguation)
 Operation Backhander, US landings around Cape Gloucester, Pacific Campaign, World War 2
 Bribery